Fenty can refer to:

Fenty (fashion house), Rihanna's brand under LVMH
Fenty Beauty, Rihanna's cosmetics brand
Forward Operating Base Fenty, Afghanistan
"Fenty", a 2022 song by French Montana and NAV

People with the surname
Adrian Fenty, former mayor of Washington, DC
John Fenty, British businessman
Peter Fenty, Anglican bishop
Renaldo Fenty, Barbadian footballer
Rihanna, whose full name is Robyn Rihanna Fenty

See also
Fendi, a luxury brand under LVMH